Anda Zaice (born 14 June 1941)  is a Latvian actress. She is known for roles in Trial on the Road (1971), Atcereties vai aizmirst (1982) and Alyonka (1962).

References 

Living people
1941 births
Latvian film actresses
20th-century Latvian actresses
Place of birth missing (living people)